During the 1991–92 English football season, Middlesbrough F.C. competed in the Football League Second Division.

Season summary
In the 1991–92 season, Lawrence's first season at the helm was a success, with Boro reaching the League Cup semi-finals for the second time and most significantly finishing runners-up in the Second Division and booking their place in the inaugural Premier League.

Final league table

Results
Middlesbrough's score comes first

Legend

Football League Second Division

FA Cup

League Cup

Full Members' Cup

Squad

References

Middlesbrough F.C. seasons
Middlesbrough